This is a list of fictional characters from DC Comics who are enemies of the Metal Men.

List
In alphabetical order (with issue and date of first appearance):

References

  Content in this article was copied from DC Comics Database, which is licensed under the Creative Commons Attribution-Share Alike 3.0 (Unported) (CC-BY-SA 3.0) license.

Lists of DC Comics characters
 
Lists of DC Comics supervillains
Enemies